Bo Breukers (born 20 May 1999) is a Dutch professional footballer who plays as a midfielder for RKSV Groene Ster.

References

External links
 

1999 births
Living people
Dutch footballers
Fortuna Sittard players
FC Dordrecht players
RKSV Groene Ster players
Eerste Divisie players
Association football midfielders
People from Sittard-Geleen
Footballers from Limburg (Netherlands)